Not Safe may refer to:

Not Safe with Nikki Glaser, a television series on Comedy Central
"Not Safe", song by Corrosion of Conformity from Eye for an Eye
"Not Safe", song by Romeo Void from Benefactor (album) and Never Say Never (Romeo Void song) EP